"Faith/Pureyes" is the second single released by Yuna Ito. It's a double a-side single that features the two songs "Faith" and "Pureyes". "Faith" is a dark, emotional ballad whereas "Pureyes" is more of an up-beat, pop tune.

"Faith" was the ending theme for the Japanese drama, "Unfair", whereas "Pureyes" was featured in the Bioclen Zero contact lenses CM.

"Faith/Pureyes" debuted at #4 but fell down the charts in the following days. It ultimately placed at #6 on the Oricon Weekly Charts and sold close to 23,000 copies its first week.

Track listing
 Faith 
 Pureyes
 Faith: Instrumental
 Pureyes: Instrumental

Live performances
March 3, 2006 — Music Station
March 3, 2006 — Music Fighter

Charts
Oricon Sales Chart (Japan)

2006 singles
Yuna Ito songs